The SpaceX Mars program is a set of projects through which the aerospace company SpaceX hopes to facilitate the colonization of Mars. The company claims that this is necessary for the long-term survival of the human species and that its Mars program, including the ongoing development of the SpaceX Starship, will reduce space transportation costs, thereby making travel to Mars a more realistic possibility.

Elon Musk, who founded SpaceX, first presented his goal of enabling Mars colonization in 2001 as a member of the Mars Society's board of directors. In the 2000s and early 2010s, SpaceX made many vehicle concepts for delivering payloads and crews to Mars, including space tugs, heavy-lift launch vehicles, and Red Dragon capsules. The company's current Mars plan was first formally proposed in 2016 International Astronautical Congress alongside a fully-reusable launch vehicle, the Interplanetary Transport System. Since then, the launch vehicle proposal was altered and renamed to "Starship", and has been in development since. The company has given many estimates of dates of the first human landing on Mars.

SpaceX plans for early missions to Mars to involve small fleets of Starship spacecraft, funded by public–private partnerships. The company hopes that once infrastructure is established on Mars and the launch cost is reduced further, colonization can begin.

The program has been criticized as impractical, both because of uncertainties regarding its financing and because it only addresses transportation to Mars and not the problem of sustaining human life there.

Background

Growth of private spaceflight 

Before founding SpaceX, Musk joined the Mars Society's board of directors for a short time. He was offered a plenary talk at their convention where he announced Mars Oasis, a project to land a miniature experimental greenhouse and grow plants on Mars, to revive public interest in space exploration. Musk initially attempted to acquire a Dnepr ICBM for the project through Russian contacts from Jim Cantrell. Russian officials were unreceptive to Musk's approach and on the flight back from Moscow, Musk worked on a spreadsheet and concluded that they could build their own rockets. Over time, Musk's goal evolved from a small publicity mission to generate interest in going to Mars, to a full-scale effort to create an architecture that would enable a self-sustaining human settlement on Mars. This led to the formation of SpaceX.

Reusable launch system

Tenets 

As early as 2007, Elon Musk stated a personal goal of eventually enabling human exploration and settlement of Mars, although his personal public interest in Mars goes back at least to 2001 at the Mars Society. SpaceX has stated its goal is to colonize Mars to ensure the long-term survival of the human species.

Starship's reusability is expected to reduce launch costs, expanding space access to more payloads and entities. According to Robert Zubrin, aerospace engineer and advocate for human exploration of Mars, Starship's lower launch cost would make space-based economy, colonization, and mining practical. Lower cost to space may potentially make space research profitable, allowing major advancements in medicine, computers, material science, and more. Musk has stated that a Starship orbital launch will cost less than $2 million. Pierre Lionnet, director of research at Eurospace, claimed otherwise, citing the rocket's multi-billion-dollar development cost and its current lack of external demand.

Launch vehicle 

Starship is designed to be a fully reusable and orbital rocket, aiming to drastically reduce launch costs and maintenance between flights. The rocket will consist of a Super Heavy first stage or a booster and a Starship second stage or spacecraft, powered by Raptor and Raptor Vacuum engines. Both the rocket stages' body are made from stainless steel, giving Starship its shine and strength for atmospheric entry.

Methane was chosen for the Raptor engines because it is relatively cheap, produces low amount of soot as compared to other hydrocarbons, and can be created on Mars from carbon dioxide and hydrogen via the Sabatier reaction. The engine family uses a new alloy for the main combustion chamber, allowing it to contain  of pressure, the highest of all current engines. In the future, it may be mass-produced and cost about $230,000 per engine or $100 per kilonewton.

Starship is the launch vehicle's second stage and will serve as a long-duration spacecraft on some missions. By refueling the Starship spacecraft in orbit using tanker spacecraft, Starship will be able to transport larger payloads and more astronauts to other Earth orbits, the Moon, and Mars.

Program manifest 
SpaceX plans to build a crewed base on Mars for an extended surface presence, which it hopes will grow into a self-sufficient colony. A successful colonization, meaning an established human presence on Mars growing over many decades, would ultimately involve many more economic actors than SpaceX. Musk has made many tentative predictions about the date Starship's first Mars landing, including 2029.

Exploration 
Musk plans for the first crewed Mars missions to have approximately 12 people, with the goals of "build[ing] out and troubleshoot[ing] the propellant plant and Mars Base Alpha power system" and establishing a "rudimentary base." He has claimed that, in the event of an emergency during travel, the spaceship would be able to safely return to Earth. The company plans to process resources on Mars into fuel for return journeys, and use similar technologies on Earth to create carbon-neutral propellant.

Colonization and terraforming 

The program aims to send a million people to Mars, using a thousand Starships sent during a Mars launch window. Proposed journeys would require 80 to 150 days of transit time, with averaging approximately 115 days (for the nine synodic periods occurring between 2020 and 2037).

Prior launch vehicle proposals

Early heavy-lift concepts 

In November 2005, before SpaceX launched the Falcon 1, its first rocket, CEO Elon Musk first referenced a long-term and high-capacity rocket concept named BFR. The BFR would be able to launch  to low Earth orbit and equipped with Merlin 2 engines. The Merlin 2 is in direct lineage to the Merlin engines used in the Falcon 9 and comparable to the F-1 engines used in the Saturn V.

In July 2010, after the final launch of Falcon 1 a year prior, SpaceX presented launch vehicle and Mars space tug concepts at a conference. The launch vehicle concepts were called Falcon X, Falcon X Heavy, and Falcon XX; the largest of all is the Falcon XX with a  capacity to low Earth orbit. To deliver such payload, the rocket was going to be as tall as the Saturn V and use six powerful Merlin 2 engines. Around 2012, the company first mentioned the Mars Colonial Transporter rocket concept in public.

Red Dragon capsule

Interplanetary Transport System 

On 26 September 2016, a day before the 67th International Astronautical Congress, the Raptor engine fired for the first time. At the event, Musk announced SpaceX was developing a new rocket using Raptor engines called the Interplanetary Transport System. It would have two stages, a reusable booster and spacecraft. The stages' tanks were to be made from carbon composite, storing liquid methane and liquid oxygen. Despite the rocket's  launch capacity to low Earth orbit, it was expected to have a low launch price. The spacecraft featured three variants: crew, cargo, and tanker; the tanker variant is used to transfer propellant to spacecraft in orbit. The concept, especially the technological feats required to make such a system possible and the funds needed, garnered a large amount of skepticism.

Big Falcon Rocket 

In September 2017, at the 68th Annual International Astronautical Congress, Musk announced the BFR (Big Falcon Rocket), a revision to the Interplanetary Transport System's design. Unlike its conceptual predecessor, the potential applications for the BFR were more varied. Variants of the BFR would be able to send satellites to orbit, resupply the International Space Station, land on the Moon, travel between spaceports on Earth, and ferry crew to Mars. In April 2018, the Mayor of Los Angeles confirmed plan for a BFR rocket production facility at the Port of Los Angeles, but it was cancelled around May 2020.

A year later in September 2018, Musk updated about the spacecraft's new two forward flaps at the top and three larger aft flaps at the bottom. Both set of flaps help control the spacecraft's descent, and the aft flaps are used as landing legs for the final touchdown. Two months later in November 2018, the rocket booster was first termed Super Heavy and the spacecraft was termed Starship.

Development

Uncrewed flight tests 

Starship's development is iterative and incremental, marked by tests on rocket prototypes. The first prototype to fly using a Raptor engine was called Starhopper. The vehicle had three non-retractable legs and was shorter than the final spacecraft design.

Mk1 was destroyed November 2019 during a pressure stress test and Mk2 did not fly because the Florida facility was deconstructed throughout 2020. SpaceX began naming its new Starship upper-stage prototypes with the prefix "SN", short for "serial number". No prototypes between SN1 and SN4 flew; SN1 and SN3 collapsed during pressure stress tests and SN4 exploded after its fifth engine firing. Starship SN5 was built with no flaps or nose cone, giving it a cylindrical shape. The test vehicle consisted of one Raptor engine, propellant tanks, and a mass simulator. On 5 August 2020, SN5 performed a -high flight, successfully landing on a nearby pad. On 3 September 2020, the similar-looking Starship SN6 successfully repeated the hop.

SN8 was the first complete Starship prototype and underwent four static fire tests between October and November 2020. The craft then performed the belly-flop maneuver and dove back through the atmosphere. As it tried to land, an issue with fuel tank pressure caused the prototype to lose thrust and impact the pad.

A month later, on 3 March 2021, Starship SN10 launched on the same flight path and landed hard, crushing its landing legs and exploded, probably due to a propellant tank rupture. Starship SN11, on 30 March 2021, flew into thick fog along the same flight path. Starship prototypes SN12, SN13, and SN14 were scrapped before completion, and Starship SN15 was selected to fly instead. The prototype features general improvement on its avionics, structure, and engines, incorporating prior prototype's failures. On 5 May 2021, SN15 launched, completed the same maneuvers as older prototypes, and landed softly after six minutes.

In July 2021, Super Heavy BN3 conducted its first full-duration static firing, lighting three engines. A month later, using cranes, Starship SN20 was stacked atop Super Heavy BN4 for the first time. SN20 was the first to include a body-tall heat shield, made of hexagonal heat tiles. In October 2021, the catching mechanical arms were installed onto the integration tower, and the first tank farm's construction was completed.

Planned launches 

SpaceX aims to perform the first Starship orbital test flight in 2023. The spaceflight will last ninety minutes.

Reception and feasibility 
SpaceX has not detailed plans for the spacecraft's life-support systems, radiation protection, and in situ resource utilization, technologies which are essential for space colonization.

Comparison with other proposals

References

External links 
 Official website

Human missions to Mars
Colonization of Mars
Space tourism
SpaceX Starship
Space program of the United States